This is a discography for Kansas City based rock band The Rainmakers.

Note: Unless otherwise stated, all releases are on the Polygram label in Europe and the Mercury Records label in the U.S.

Studio albums
Steve, Bob & Rich - Balls (1984, reissued 2006)
The Rainmakers (1986) reached #85 on the Billboard 200
Tornado (1987) reached #116 on the Billboard 200
The Good News and the Bad News (1989)
Flirting with the Universe (1994)
Skin (1996)
25 on (2011)
Monster Movie (2014)
Cover Band (2015)

Live albums
Oslo-Wichita LIVE (April 1990)
Thanksgiving 2011 (December 2011)

Compilation albums
The Best of the Rainmakers (1993)

Singles

Other
Checkin' In with The Rainmakers (1986, promotional tape)
Live (1988, promotional CD recorded live at The Kennel Club, San Francisco, January 31, 1988)
Hempilation, Vol. 2: Free the Weed (1998, Capricorn Records, The Rainmakers cover One Toke Over the Line with original artists Brewer & Shipley singing the long lost third verse of the song)

References

Rainmakers, The
Rock music group discographies